Pierre Lambert Ledrou, O.E.S.A. (1641 – 6 May 1721) was a Roman Catholic prelate who served as Titular Bishop of Porphyreon (1692–1721).

Biography
Pierre Lambert Ledrou was born in Huy, Belgium in 1641 and ordained a priest in the Order of Hermits of St. Augustine on 12 April 1664.
On 25 June 1692, he was appointed during the papacy of Pope Innocent XII as Titular Bishop of Porphyreon.
On 21 December 1692, he was consecrated bishop by Fabrizio Spada, Cardinal-Priest of San Crisogono, with Michelangelo Mattei, Titular Archbishop of Hadrianopolis in Haemimonto, and Giovanni Battista Visconti Aicardi, Bishop of Novara, serving as co-consecrators.
He served as Titular Bishop of Porphyreon until his death on 6 May 1721.

Episcopal succession
While bishop, he was the principal co-consecrator of: 
Carlo Cutillo, Bishop of Minori (1694); 
Giovanni Battista Capilupi, Bishop of Polignano (1694);
Giovanni Battista Gentile, Bishop of Ajaccio (1694);
Girolamo Grimaldi, Titular Archbishop of Edessa in Osrhoëne (1713); and
Jean-Ernest de Löwenstein-Wertheim, Bishop of Tournai (1714).

References

External links and additional sources

 (for Chronology of Bishops) 
 (for Chronology of Bishops)  

17th-century Roman Catholic titular bishops
18th-century Roman Catholic titular bishops
Bishops appointed by Pope Innocent XII
1641 births
1721 deaths
Augustinian bishops